Toomas Frey (13 December 1937 – 23 September 2020) was an Estonian ecologist, geobotanist and forest scientist.

Frey was born in Põltsamaa. He was also a political leader, with the Estonian Green Movement. When he was named Minister of the Environment in 1990, it was the first time a member of a green political organisation reached a national position in any European government.

References

1937 births
2020 deaths
20th-century Estonian botanists
Estonian ecologists
People from Põltsamaa
Forestry researchers
Environment ministers of Estonia
Estonian Greens politicians
Estonian University of Life Sciences alumni
Academic staff of the Estonian University of Life Sciences
Academic staff of the University of Tartu
Estonian foresters
21st-century Estonian botanists